Nodule may refer to:

Nodule (geology), a small rock or mineral cluster
Manganese nodule, a metallic concretion found on the seafloor
Nodule (medicine), a small aggregation of cells
Root nodule, a growth on the roots of legumes
 A feature of mollusc sculpture